The Central District of Damghan County is a district (bakhsh) in Damghan County, Semnan Province, Iran. At the 2006 census, its population was 72,967, in 20,303 families.  The District has three cities: Damghan, Dibaj, and Kalateh Rudbar. The District has three rural districts (dehestan): Damankuh Rural District, Howmeh Rural District, and Rudbar Rural District.

References 

Districts of Semnan Province
Damghan County